Osage Township is one of twenty-four townships in Bates County, Missouri, and is part of the Kansas City metropolitan area within the USA.  As of the 2000 census, its population was 1,837.

The township takes its name from the Osage River.

Geography
According to the United States Census Bureau, Osage Township covers an area of 44.86 square miles (116.17 square kilometers); of this, 44.73 square miles (115.84 square kilometers, 99.72 percent) is land and 0.13 square miles (0.33 square kilometers, 0.28 percent) is water.

Cities, towns, villages
 Rich Hill

Adjacent townships
 Lone Oak Township (northeast)
 Prairie Township (east)
 Blue Mound Township, Vernon County (southeast)
 Metz Township, Vernon County (southwest)
 Howard Township (west)
 New Home Township (northwest)

Cemeteries
The township contains these two cemeteries: Fairview Rider and Greenlawn.

Major highways
  U.S. Route 71

Airports and landing strips
 Schooley Airport

School districts
 Rich Hill R-IV

Political districts
 Missouri's 4th congressional district
 State House District 125
 State Senate District 31

References
 United States Census Bureau 2008 TIGER/Line Shapefiles
 United States Board on Geographic Names (GNIS)
 United States National Atlas

External links
 US-Counties.com
 City-Data.com

Townships in Bates County, Missouri
Townships in Missouri